Amasike Emelonye (born 7 November 1962) is a Nigerian film producer and motorsports coach. He is known for producing the award-winning film Last Flight to Abuja (2012), and in February 2020 was a guest on the first ever Nigerian Outdoor Reality TV Series Camp Out 9ja (2020) written by Success Akpojotor and anchored by Soba Mac Pepple of KUFM.

References

External links

1962 births
Living people
21st-century Nigerian people
Nigerian film producers